Robert Mandel (born 1945) is a film producer and director and television director from Oakland, California. He is best known for his film School Ties, which includes early film roles in the careers of Brendan Fraser, Matt Damon, Ben Affleck, Cole Hauser and Chris O'Donnell.

Biography
Robert Mandel was born in Oakland, California, but grew up in Queens, New York, where he became interested in theater. Mandel attended Bucknell University and decided to pursue stage directing at Manhattan Theatre Club and The Public Theater during the early 1970s.

During the late 1970s, Mandel attended M.F.A. studies at Columbia University and then at the AFI Conservatory, where he graduated in 1979. During his studies at the American Film Institute, Mandel received the Alfred Hitchcock Award for his thesis film, Night at O'Rears, which then went on to win the First Prize at Filmex in Los Angeles, First Prize at the USA Film Festival in Dallas, Texas; and was exhibited at the New York Film Festival at Lincoln Center.

Mandel went on to become a successful film director, as well as a television series director, having directed Lost, Nash Bridges and The Practice. He was the director of the pilot for The X-Files and the sixth episode of Prison Break. Mandel was the original director hired on for what was then titled Carrie 2: Say You're Sorry but quickly left the production over "creative differences." Katt Shea took over as director for the film, which was eventually released as The Rage: Carrie 2.

Mandel was the dean of AFI Conservatory for nine years from 2005 to 2014.

Filmography

Film
Nights at O'Rear's (1980) 
Independence Day (1983)
F/X (1986)
Touch and Go (1986)
Big Shots (1987)
School Ties (1992)
The Substitute (1996)

Television
Perfect Witness (1989) 
The Haunted (1991) 
The X-Files (1993) - pilot
Sisters (1994) - 1 episode 
Kansas (1995)
Special Report: Journey to Mars (1996)
Dellaventura (1997) - 1 episode
Nash Bridges (1997-2000) - 6 episodes
The Practice (1998) - 1 episode
Thin Air (2000)
WW 3 a.k.a. Winds of Terror (2001)
The District (2001) - 1 episode 
Hysteria – The Def Leppard Story (2001)
A Season on the Brink (2002)
The Secret Life of Zoey (2002)
Lost (2005) - 1 episode
Prison Break (2005) - 1 episode
Dominion (2015) - 2 episodes
Game of Silence (2016) - 1 episode

References

External links 

American film directors
American film producers
American television directors
Bucknell University alumni
Columbia University School of the Arts alumni
Living people
1945 births